Christine Margaret Michell (born 1951) AKA Christa Michell, is an English flautist and composer of ambient-classic and New Age music; Dolphin Love album (1991) was an early example of the New Age genre, with dolphin, whale and sea sounds, intrinsic to the musical texture.

Early life and education
With Welsh, Scottish and Irish ancestry, Hughes was born in Hampton, near Malpas, Cheshire, England. She attended the University of Liverpool (1969—72) and the Guildhall School of Music (1972—73), London.

Career
Michell became sub-principal flute/piccolo with Welsh National Opera for five years (1976—81), as well as freelancing with Royal Liverpool Philharmonic Orchestra, BBC, English National Ballet, Opera North, Manchester Camerata, and Northern Ballet until 1986. Her teaching positions included the Royal College of Music's junior department, Lancaster University, Putney High School, Royal High School, Bath, and Wells Cathedral School, Somerset.

Michell started her independent record label, Astarte Music Productions, in 1989. Mark Vibrans produced her first album Song for Sophie 1989 for Astarte Music. Michell also started performing with Nigel Shaw at this time and developed the free improvisatory style that became their trademark, in the album Dreaming Pool 1990. 
In 1991 she recorded Dolphin Love with Clifford White and Arnie Sage and this proved to be a popular album in UK, USA and Australia.

After performing at an International New Age Music Conference in Los Angeles in 1991, Michell was offered a record deal with World Discs, USA and later Northsound, USA (now liquidated); as well as with New World in Australia and Oreade Music, Netherlands.

In 1999, Michell (as Christa Michell) recorded Tibetan Chakra Meditations with Ben Scott, giving a 5% Royalty from each album sold to the Tibet Relief Fund, London.

In 2001 she had a personal audience and performed for the Dalai Lama in Dharamsala, India. She presented him with her album Tibetan Freedom Chants, which was recorded with monk Ven. Bhagdro, to raise money and awareness for the Tibetan cause.

Discography

References

Living people
1951 births
English flautists
Ambient musicians
New-age musicians